Graceville Colony is a census-designated place (CDP) corresponding to the Gracevale Hutterite colony in Lake County, South Dakota, United States. The population was 21 at the 2020 census. It was first listed as a CDP prior to the 2020 census.

It is in the southwest part of the county, on the east side of the East Fork of the Vermillion River, a south-flowing tributary of the Missouri River.

Demographics

References 

Census-designated places in Lake County, South Dakota
Census-designated places in South Dakota
Hutterite communities in the United States